Wangdue Phodrang (Dzongkha 'Wangdi Phodr'a) is a town and capital (dzongkhag thromde) of Wangdue Phodrang District in central Bhutan. It is located in Thedtsho Gewog.

History

The town shares its name with the Wangdue Phodrang Dzong built in 1638 that dominates the district. The name is said to have been given by Ngawang Namgyal, the 1st Zhabdrung Rinpoche, who was searching for the best location for a dzong to prevent incursions from the south. At the chosen spot, the Zhabdrung encountered a boy named Wangdi playing beside the river and hence named the dzong "Wangdi's Palace".

Fire and reconstruction 

Wangdi Phodrang Dzong burnt down in the afternoon of 24 June 2012, supposedly because of a faulty electrical water cooker. However, the dzong was being renovated at the time, so most of the historical relics had already been put into storage and were saved from destruction.  Shortly after the fire, more than 1000 Japanese sympathizers donated an equivalent of over US$134,500 to the Wangdue Phodrang Reconstruction Fund.  Other donations have also arrived, but reconstruction is still underway as of 2014.

Topology
There are three paved roads in Wangdi Phodrang. The Lateral Road enters from the west at Dochula Pass, crosses the Sankosh River (Dzongkha: Puna Tsang Chhu) at Wangdi Phodrang Dzong, and continues east to Tongsa. One spur road heads north from Wangdi Phodrang to Punakha Dzong and slightly beyond. This becomes the footpath to Gasa.

A second spur departs the Lateral Road near the Pele Pass halfway between Wangdi and Tongsa, traveling south a short distance to Gangteng Monastery and the Phobjikha Valley, where rare black-necked cranes may be found.

Climate
Wangdue Phodrang features a dry-winter humid subtropical climate (Köppen Cwa).

References

External links
Satellite map at Maplandia.com

Populated places in Bhutan
Wangdue Phodrang District